
Year 417 (CDXVII) was a common year starting on Monday (link will display the full calendar) of the Julian calendar. At the time, it was known as the Year of the Consulship of Honorius and Constantius (or, less frequently, year 1170 Ab urbe condita). The denomination 417 for this year has been used since the early medieval period, when the Anno Domini calendar era became the prevalent method in Europe for naming years.

Events 
 By place 

 Roman Empire 
 January 1 – Emperor Honorius forces his half-sister Galla Placidia into marriage to Constantius, his general (magister militum). He is appointed patricius and becomes a prominent member of the House of Theodosius.
 The Visigoths are granted Aquitaine, and become allies (foederati) of the Western Roman Empire. King Wallia establishes his capital at Toulouse.

 Asia 
 Nulji becomes king of the Korean kingdom of Silla.

 By topic 

 Religion 
 January – Pope Innocent I condemns Pelagianism, and excommunicates the ascetic Pelagius.
 March 12 – Innocent I dies after a 16-year reign in which he has restored relations between the sees of Rome and Antioch, enforced celibacy of the clergy, and maintained the right of the bishop of Rome to judge appeals from other churches. Innocent is succeeded by Zosimus as the 41st pope.

Births 
 Peter the Iberian, Georgian theologian and Saint (approximate date)
 Justa Grata Honoria, daughter of Constantius III (approximate date)

Deaths 
 March 12 – Pope Innocent I
 Li Gao, Chinese general of the state Western Liang (b. 351)
 Yao Hong, last emperor of the Qiang state Later Qin (b. 388)

References